The brass section of the orchestra, concert band, and jazz ensemble consist of brass instruments, and is one of the main sections in all three ensembles. The British-style brass band contains only brass and percussion instruments.

They contain instruments given Hornbostel-Sachs classification 423 (brass instruments).

Orchestra
The typical brass section of a modern orchestra is as follows:

4 French horns
2–3 Trumpets
2 Tenor trombones
1 Bass trombone
1 Tuba

Concert band

The brass section of the concert band is generally larger and more diverse than the brass section of the orchestra.

The typical brass section of a concert band is as follows:

4–6 Trumpets and/or cornets
4 French horns
2–3 Tenor trombones
1 Bass trombone
2 Euphoniums and/or baritone horns
2 Tubas

The brass instruments that are sometimes, but very rarely, used in the concert band:
 Flugelhorn
 Tenor (alto) Horn
 Piccolo trumpet
 Bass trumpet
 Wagner tuba
 Alto trombone 
 Contrabass trombone

Brass band
 1 soprano cornet
 10 cornets
 1 flugelhorn
 3 tenor (alto) horns
 2 baritone horns
 2 tenor trombones
 1 bass trombone
 2 euphoniums
 2 E tubas
 2 B tubas

Jazz ensemble

The brass section of jazz ensembles usually include:

4 trumpets
3 Tenor trombones
1 Bass trombone

See also
Woodwind section
String section
Percussion section
Keyboard section

References

Sections of the orchestra
Sections of the concert band